Fazil Juma Kaggwa (born 9 May 1995) is a Ugandan boxer. He competed in the light flyweight category at the 2014 Commonwealth Games where he won a bronze medal.

References

External links
 
 
 

1995 births
Living people
Sportspeople from Kampala
Commonwealth Games bronze medallists for Uganda
Boxers at the 2014 Commonwealth Games
Ugandan male boxers
Commonwealth Games medallists in boxing
Light-flyweight boxers
Medallists at the 2014 Commonwealth Games